Shadkuh (also Romanized as Shādkūh; also known as Shākūh) is a village in Gil Dulab Rural District, in the Central District of Rezvanshahr County, Gilan Province, Iran. At the 2006 census, its population was 259, in 73 families.

References 

Populated places in Rezvanshahr County